Thomas O'Connor (born Dublin, Ireland; died 30 June 1987), also known as Tommy O'Connor or Tom O'Connor, was an Irish footballer who played for Shamrock Rovers. On 21 September 1949, together with Con Martin, Johnny Carey and Peter Farrell, he was also a member of the Ireland team that defeated England 2–0 at Goodison Park, becoming the first non-UK team to beat England at home.

O'Connor first attracted attention while playing for Shamrock Rovers in the early part of the 1948–49 season. His impressive performances for Rovers led him to making four appearances for  Ireland in 1949. He made his  international debut on 8 September 1949 in a 3–0 win against Finland at Dalymount Park. The game was a 1950 World Cup qualifier and O'Connor put in an impressive performance, helping the Irish win 3–0.

O'Connor was preferred over both Tommy Eglington and Jackie O'Driscoll for the game against England. This proved an astute selection as O'Connor set up both of the Irish goals. Ireland took the lead in the 33rd minute when Peter Desmond, after collecting a pass from O'Connor, was brought down in the penalty area; Con Martin converted the subsequent penalty kick. In the 85th minute, O'Connor slipped the ball to Peter Farrell and as the English goalkeeper Bert Williams advanced, Farrell lofted the ball into the unguarded net.

He made his third appearance for Ireland on 9 October in the return game against Finland, which finished as a 1–1 draw, before making his final international appearance on 13 November against Sweden in 3–1 home defeat. Like his debut, both of these games were World Cup qualifiers.

After leaving Rovers, O'Connor played in the Leinster Senior League.

Honours

Inter-City Cup:
  Shamrock Rovers 1949: 1
LFA President's Cup:
  Shamrock Rovers 1948-49: 1

References

Year of birth missing
1987 deaths
Republic of Ireland association footballers
Ireland (FAI) international footballers
Shamrock Rovers F.C. players
League of Ireland players
Association footballers from County Dublin
League of Ireland XI players
Leinster Senior League (association football) players
Association football forwards